A teen idol is a celebrity with a large teenage fan base. Teen idols are generally young but are not necessarily teenagers. An idol's popularity may be limited to teens, or may extend to all age groups.

By region

Asia 

East Asia possesses a robust fan culture centered around idols, one that spans both genders and generates broad appeal. East Asian idol culture, which first began in Japan in the 1960s, would spread to neighboring countries in later decades: in South Korea and Taiwan, for example, it took root in the 1990s, and in China the 2010s. Idols are also not limited to singing, and may take part in more explicitly image-focused venues such as pin-up photography (gravure idols) and pornography (AV idols).

There are many different idols and idol groups spread across many countries. In Japan, there are pop stars Ayumi Hamasaki and Namie Amuro as well as Kana Nishino and music groups such as Momoiro Clover Z, Morning Musume, AKB48, and Perfume and Johnny & Associates boy bands Arashi, NEWS, KAT-TUN, and Hey! Say! JUMP among others. In Taiwan, there are pop icons such as Jay Chou, Jolin Tsai, music groups Mayday, F4, and S.H.E. In South Korea, notable K-pop personalities include singers BoA and Rain and groups BTS, Exo, TVXQ, 2PM, 2AM, Beast, Shinee, Super Junior, 2NE1, Big Bang, Wonder Girls, T-ara, Kara, Blackpink and Girls' Generation. In Vietnam, there are the singers WanBi Tuấn Anh, Sơn Tùng M-TP, Đông Nhi, Bảo Thy and Tóc Tiên.

Europe 

European teen idols include German popstar Bill Kaulitz of the pop-rock band Tokio Hotel and the members of the Anglo-Irish pop boy band One Direction, and Girls Aloud, another Anglo-Irish band. In Spain, La Oreja de Van Gogh, Miguel Bosé, Mecano, and Hombres G all enjoyed teen-idol status. In the Balkans, the late Macedonian singer Toše Proeski was considered a teen idol.

Latin America 

In Latin America, idols ranges from Mexican pop stars Timbiriche, Lynda Thomas, Magneto, Puerto Rican born Mexican Luis Miguel, Colombian Shakira and the popular Puerto Rican boy band Menudo in the 1980s and 1990s, and Paty Cantú, Anahí, Belinda, and RBD in the 2000s and 2010s. Besides, former Menudo member Ricky Martin, their chief rivals Los Chicos and former member Chayanne, Venezuelan actor and singer Guillermo Davila and more, to Argentina, where telenovela, Chiquititas, ushered in a new era of teen-idols for that country, including actors Benjamin Rojas, Felipe Colombo, Luisana Lopilato, and Camila Bordonaba, who went on to form teen band Erreway, precursors to Mexican band RBD.

North America 
Often teen idols are actors or musicians. Some teen idols began their careers as child actors, such as Britney Spears, Hilary Duff, Raven-Symoné and Miley Cyrus. There were teen idols before there were teen magazines, but idols have always been a permanent feature in magazines such as Seventeen, 16, Tiger Beat and Right On! in the United States, and in similar magazines elsewhere. With the advent of television, teen idols were also promoted through programs such as American Bandstand, The Ed Sullivan Show, Soul Train. Today's teen idols have spawned an entire industry of gossip magazines, television shows, YouTube, social media, and whole television channels such as E!.

By era

Early teen idols 

The first known person to have been treated as a teen idol was Franz Liszt, the Hungarian pianist who, in the 1840s, drew such a following among teen girls that the term "Lisztomania" soon came to describe the phenomenon. The kind of idolizing following Liszt drew in Europe would not be followed for several decades. American-born Roger Wolfe Kahn became, arguably, America's first modern-day teen idol, when, in 1924 at the age of sixteen he launched his first jazz band. Throughout his teens, he became dubbed the 'Millionaire Maestro.'  Geraldine Farrar, American opera singer, had a large following of young women nicknamed "Gerry-flappers" in the early 20th century. Rudy Vallée, who became a major success in 1929 with hits like "Honey" and "Deep Night", may have been the first American popular singer to have been idolised by hundreds of teen-aged girls at sold-out concerts. He was also possibly the first popular singer to have a star vehicle created for him: The Vagabond Lover.

Frank Sinatra, whose early career in the 1940s is often linked to his appeal to bobby soxers, who got that name because they were forced to dance in their bobby socks so that their shoes would not damage the dance floor, is also regarded as having been amongst the first teen idols.

1950s–1960s
Although he had only three major movie roles, James Dean earned two Oscar nominations. He also had the image of a rebellious youth, something that was popular among girls and young women. His performance in Rebel Without A Cause (1955) and his untimely death in a road collision in 1955 cemented his status as an icon. Contemporary teenagers still wear white T-shirts and jeans in his style.

Selected by Walt Disney in 1955 for his new show The Mickey Mouse Club, Annette Funicello became popular among viewers by the end of the first season. Elvis Presley made his debut in the mid-1950s and became a sensation. Deemed too dangerous to be filmed except from the waist up because of his sexually suggestive dance moves, he became popular among teenagers. The success of young rock stars like Presley, film stars like Marlon Brando, Paul Newman, James Dean, Tab Hunter, and Sal Mineo in the 1950s, as well as the wider emergence of youth subcultures, led promoters to the deliberate creation of teen idols such as singers Frankie Avalon, Fabian Forte, Bobby Rydell, Annette, Frankie Lymon, and Connie Stevens. Even crooners like Frank Sinatra were still considered idols and rather handsome. Actors Edd Byrnes and Troy Donahue and other artists deliberately cultivated a (safer) idol image, like Canadian musician Paul Anka.

Post-war teens were able to buy relatively inexpensive phonographs — including portable models that could be carried to friends' houses — and the new 45-rpm singles. Rock music played on 45s became the soundtrack to the 1960s as people bought what they heard on the radio. The great majority of the music being marketed to 1950s teens was being written by adults, but 1960s teens were increasingly appreciating and emulating artists closer to their own age, to teen fashion, and to lyrics which addressed their own concerns. Their parents worried about their attraction to artists (and DJs) who were edgy and rebellious. Faces on magazines fed fans; fans buy records, see films, watch TV and buy fashions.

Some marketers turned to film and TV for fresh, 'safe' faces. Tommy Sands's debut in a television film about the phenomenon, The Idol, made a teen idol out of Sands himself. Ricky Nelson, a performer of rockabilly music, also became a teen idol through his parents' television series, The Adventures of Ozzie and Harriet. With many parents disapproving of Elvis Presley, Nelson became a safe alternative. However, he found himself outclassed by the Beatles when they arrived in the U.S. in 1964.

The Beatles soon became the most successful and influential band in modern musical history, staying at the top of Billboard charts for a grand total of 58 weeks between 1964 and 1970. Adolescent hysteria was so loud that the band had trouble performing at concerts. The level of stardom they achieved in the U.S.—dubbed Beatlemania—was never before seen in that country, not even during the heyday of Elvis Presley.

Some young TV stars were being hustled into studios to make recordings; for example, ex-Mousketeer Annette Funicello became one of the first big female idols as well as the Lennon Sisters whom had cut out dolls and were always on the covers of the gossip magazines; another, Johnny Crawford of The Rifleman, had five Top-40 hits. In 1963, Luke Halpin made a big splash as a teen idol in the television program Flipper. After Bye Bye Birdie was released in 1963, Bobby Rydell became an instant teen idol.

In the 1960s as situation comedies and dramas on television using child actors became more popular, actors Paul Petersen, Patty Petersen, and Shelley Fabares from The Donna Reed Show, Dwayne Hickman from The Many Loves of Dobie Gillis, Sally Field of Gidget, Jon Provost of Lassie, Jay North from Dennis the Menace, and Keith and Kevin Schultz known as the "Schultz Twins" on The Monroes all became younger preteen idols and grew into being teen idols.

Herman's Hermits, the Rolling Stones, and the Beach Boys were teen idols, especially during the earlier part of their careers, although they quickly grew out of that status. The Rolling Stones did it through a more rebellious image, the Beatles did it through their more developed (or "grown up") music. Similarly, Neil Sedaka had two distinct eras of his career, with about a decade in between: one as a teen idol in the 1960s, and a later career in adult contemporary music. Roy Orbison was known for his songs "Oh, Pretty Woman," "Only the Lonely," and "Crying." From the family band the Cowsills, Susan Cowsill, John Cowsill and Barry Cowsill became teen idols.  Many of the teen idols of the era were the sons of older, established stars; Dino, Desi & Billy were active as teen idols during the mid-sixties. The group included Dean Paul Martin (son of singer Dean Martin), and Billy Hinsche (a mutual friend whose parents were not famous). Gary Lewis, son of comedian Jerry Lewis, fronted the Playboys during this era.

All of the Monkees became instant teen idols in the late 1960s after their TV show became an overnight success, especially for Micky Dolenz and Davy Jones. The British-born Monkee Davy Jones was regularly featured in teen fan magazines. In 2008, Yahoo Music named Jones the number one teen idol of all time, and in 2009 he was ranked second in a list compiled by Fox News.

Teen fan magazine TeenSet began publishing in 1964, focusing on youthful bands and musicians. Tiger Beat magazine began competing for the same audience in 1965.

1970s

After Davy Jones came Bobby Sherman and David Cassidy, who held the title of Teen Idols from the late 1960s until the mid-1970s. Both Sherman and Cassidy were actors on television and chart topping musicians in the pop-rock category at the time; with David Cassidy in particular enjoying immense international fame and success. Sherman was on hit TV shows Shindig! and Here Come the Brides among many others. Musical series such as Cassidy's The Partridge Family, the animated series The Archie Show, and (to a lesser extent) The Brady Bunch integrated television and teen-pop music to significant success during this time frame. The Brady Bunch's Barry Williams and Christopher Knight, as was tennis pro/actor Vincent Van Patten all were constantly in the fan magazines at the time. Popular actors such as John Moulder Brown, Leonard Whiting, Ray Lovelock (Raymond Lovelock), Leif Garrett, Mark Hamill, Mark Lester, Jan-Michael Vincent and Jack Wild were the talk of the teenagers in the 1970s as well. Musical group the Hudson Brothers were on many teen magazine covers for a number of years as teen idols. They had two shows on TV during the 1970s and recorded many albums.

One of the features of many teen idols is that their fans (and, in some cases, the musicians themselves) tended to develop a hate for the music once they became adults, and it is not much listened to by adults, except for nostalgia: the legacy of bubblegum pop. Teen idol performers in this category would include Shaun Cassidy, Leif Garrett, the Osmond Brothers (particularly Donny Osmond and their teen idol sister Marie Osmond), Andy Gibb, Tony DeFranco of the Canadian band the DeFranco Family, and the Bay City Rollers (UK). Even modern classic hits and oldies outlets, which cover this time period, rarely play cuts from the teen idols of the era. A notable exception is Michael Jackson of the Jackson Five, who began his career as a teen idol along with his brothers, but whose individual career eventually evolved far beyond the limitations of that description and into superstardom.

The Jackson Five were the first African-American music group to become national teen idols, appearing along with famous white idols in magazines such as 16 and Tiger Beat. In addition, the charismatic appeal, showmanship and flurry of fans towards lead Michael Jackson made him a teen idol and heartthrob amongst teens; his success as a soloist continued into the 1980s.

1980s

In 1985, actress Alyssa Milano from Who's the Boss? became a major teen idol and was dubbed "The Teen Queen of the 1980s". In the mid-1980s there was a group of young actors called the Brat Pack; the whole group collectively and separately became teen idols. They were Emilio Estevez, Anthony Michael Hall, Rob Lowe, Andrew McCarthy, Demi Moore, Judd Nelson, Molly Ringwald, and Ally Sheedy. They starred in many coming of age films together in some fashion and became very popular without being musicians. Molly Ringwald entered the limelight with the films Sixteen Candles and The Breakfast Club.

Actors Corey Feldman and Corey Haim also became teen idols during the later part of the 1980s with films The Goonies and together The Lost Boys, Dream a Little Dream and License to Drive among other films. They were dubbed "the two Coreys". Before Corey Haim's death in 2010, they did a reality TV show for two seasons (2007–08) on A&E named The Two Coreys after their 1980s moniker.

Actor River Phoenix during his teen years became a teen idol during the later part of the 1980s, as did Christian Slater.

Australian singer-actor Rick Springfield was regarded as the teen idol in the 1980s with such hits as "Jessie's Girl" and "Don't Talk to Strangers". The Grammy Award-winning musician Springfield was known for playing Dr. Noah Drake on the daytime drama General Hospital. He originated the character from 1981 to 1983. He left acting after his music career took off.

During this decade, Puerto Rican boy band Menudo, caused a sensation in Latin America, nicknamed Menudomania that became compared to the Beatles' Beatlemania.

At the end of the 1980s, actor Kirk Cameron became a major teen idol. Cameron was best known for his role as Mike Seaver on the television situation comedy Growing Pains from 1985 to 1992. Also Scott Baio and Willie Aames of Charles in Charge fame found themselves regulars in teen magazines.

In popular music, the late 1980s was the boom of teenagers dominating the music charts. Debbie Gibson became the youngest person to write, perform and produce a number-one single, "Foolish Beat", and also had many hits from her first two albums. Tiffany, another teen icon, became a pop sensation at 15 years old thanks to an aggressive marketing strategy. She promoted her debut album in shopping malls of the US. She is also the youngest person to have a debut album hit number one and have multiple number one singles from that album ("I Think We're Alone Now" and "Could've Been"). Having become a household name, she had then-unknown band New Kids on the Block as an opening act for her shows. However, the sudden popularity of the New Kids caused their roles to be reversed. Gibson and Tiffany's careers had stalled by the early 1990s; so had NKOTB by the mid-nineties. The other boy band from Boston, New Edition, was popular with the teen set by the end of the 1980s.

One of the most popular female singers of the 1980s, with teen idol status was Madonna, especially among youth female audience which was latter named Madonna wannabes. With songs "Like a Prayer", "Who's That Girl" and "Like a Virgin" in the '80s top lists throughout the decade. She became a teen idol through her acclaimed music, groundbreaking videos, celebrity tabloid image, feminist punk spirit, public acceptance of the marginalised LGBTQ+ community, unique fashion at the time and her very loyal fanbase.

1990s 

The manufacturing of teen idols has been marketed more aggressively and with greater sophistication since the 1980s. Many of the major teen idols in the 1990s were bands and musical acts. The rise of MTV in the 1980s and the success of the boy bands and girl groups during the 1990s and 2000s continued to fuel the phenomenon. Besides a combination of good, clean-cut looks and a ubiquitous marketing campaign, such bands typically include a variety of personality types (e.g. "the shy one", "the smart one", etc.)  These idols were often found on the covers and pages of teen magazines during the 1990s as teen idols as well. Classic examples of boy bands include Menudo, New Kids on the Block, Take That, Backstreet Boys, and NSYNC, all becoming the best selling pop groups of the decade. Hanson was initially marketed as such a band, but eventually outgrew this label to become a successful indie band. Christina Aguilera, Jennifer Lopez, Mandy Moore, Jessica Simpson, and Britney Spears, along with female bands such as the Spice Girls, TLC, and Destiny's Child, also became very popular at the end of the decade. Even though the Spice Girls split in 2000, they remain fairly popular in England.

During this decade, the Latin artist Shakira was described as a "teen idol", her songs reached number 1 on Latin radio, her videos were among the most viewed, while her hair and clothing style was emulated by girls and young women. from the continent identifying with their songs, this was called "Shakiramía" or "Shakira Fever"

The Backstreet Boys' popularity grew in 1997 with "Everybody (Backstreet's Back)," a song produced by Max Martin.  Opting against joining a girl band, Britney Spears released the music video "...Baby One More Time" in 1998 on MTV, which pushed her into the public consciousness. Her first album of the same name made its debut at the top of Billboard's charts.

After the movie Clueless (1995), Alicia Silverstone became a teen idol. The 1997 film Titanic made Leonardo DiCaprio a teen idol; during "Leo-Mania" his face appeared on many teen magazines. Fraternal twin sisters and actresses Ashley Olsen and Mary-Kate Olsen were major tween idols and as they grew up they later became teen idols during the 1990s.

2000s 

The 2000s would be a decade of transition due to increasing amount of media platforms coming from TV and the internet, though Hollywood would still be a spring board for many names in the early years of the decade. Actors such as Josh Hartnett, Heath Ledger and Ashton Kutcher would dominate the teen idol scene for the early 2000s. Hartnett  become the most prominent face of the young Hollywood actors entering the 2000s. He appeared on dozens of major magazine covers and was the subject of a Vanity Fair cover story remarking on his meteoric rise to fame. The intense attention he received during this time period caused him to turn down high-profile roles, including a reported $100 million offer to play Superman, before leaving Hollywood completely.

The Walt Disney Company and its numerous outlets (e.g. Disney Channel, Radio Disney and Walt Disney Pictures)  were the first to successfully develop a new generation of teen idols in this period, starting with the careers of actresses and singers Hilary Duff and Lindsay Lohan, initially targeting youth and female teen audiences. While still teenagers, Duff became famous for her starring titular character in the Disney Channel teen sitcom Lizzie McGuire and her multi-Platinum second studio album Metamorphosis (2003), with which she became one of the youngest artists to reach the top of the Billboard 200, and Lohan became famous for her starring roles in many successful teen movies, including Freaky Friday (2003), Confessions of a Teenage Drama Queen (2004), Mean Girls (2004) and Herbie: Fully Loaded (2005), and her debut studio album Speak (2004). The success of this marketing led to further development of the genre, including new teen idols such as Raven-Symoné, Dylan and Cole Sprouse, Zac Efron, Aly & AJ, Jesse McCartney, Vanessa Hudgens, Ashley Tisdale, Corbin Bleu, Miley Cyrus, Selena Gomez, Demi Lovato and the Jonas Brothers. Disney has also used another one of its own TV channels, Freeform, to develop shows and stars popular among teen girls. Mean Girls, a well-known comedy written by Tina Fey, also saw the performances of Rachel McAdams and Amanda Seyfried (in her first role).

Raven-Symoné gained popularity as a child actor for her roles on The Cosby Show (1989-1992) and Hangin' with Mr Cooper (1993-1997) but became a household name from being the titular character on the extremely popular and successful Disney Channel Show That's So Raven (2003-2007) as well as being apart of The Cheetah Girls and the films (2003-2006). She also had a supporting role in The Princess Diaries 2: Royal Engagement (2004).

Miley Cyrus claimed her fame by playing a fictionalized version of herself on the television show Hannah Montana (2006-2011). Her 2009 singles "The Climb" and "Party in the U.S.A" were both hits. However, as she began metamorphosizing into something more mature, her popularity fell as parents considered her new materials inappropriate for their children.

Selena Gomez made her debut by starring in the Disney situational comedy Wizards of Waverly Place (2007-2012) and released her first album Kiss & Tell in 2009. She became an icon for (adolescent) girls and women, yet details of her personal life put her under public scrutiny.

ViacomCBS-owned Nickelodeon, a competitor to Disney Channel, has also developed its own slate of stars for its television shows, including Drake Bell, Josh Peck, Emma Roberts, Miranda Cosgrove, Jennette McCurdy, Nathan Kress, Jamie Lynn Spears (sister of Britney Spears), Ariana Grande, Victoria Justice, Elizabeth Gillies, and groups the Naked Brothers Band and Big Time Rush, many of whom have not only starred in TV shows, but recorded songs as well. Many of the modern-day teen idols are females marketed as "role models" to teen and tween girls, a departure from the traditional role of the male teen idol marketed as the idolized teen "heartthrob". Actress Mischa Barton became a teen idol through her role on The O.C., with Entertainment Weekly naming her character Marissa Cooper “It Girl" of 2003.

In 2002, Canadian singer Avril Lavigne dominated the music scene and eventually became a worldwide teen idol. Listed at #4 on Yahoo!'s Top 25 Teen Idols of all-time. During the popularity of her sister Jessica Simpson's MTV reality television series Newlyweds: Nick and Jessica, 7th Heaven actress Ashlee Simpson developed a music career through her own MTV spin-off reality series The Ashlee Simpson Show in 2004, and soon became a teen idol.

American musician Taylor Swift entered the scene at age 16 by co-writing the song "Tim McGraw" with Liz Rose in 2005, after which she became a well-known and successful artist as well as a teen idol.

Before reaching the age of 20, Ariana Grande had already been popular among secondary schoolchildren by starring in the teen comedy show Victorious (2010-2013). She left acting for singing, and although her singing career got off to a rocky start, she did capture the attention of producer and songwriter Max Martin, who had worked with many successful artists before.

Teen idols were also popular in the R&B and Hip-Hop realm throughout this decade, including Chris Brown, JoJo, Bow Wow, 3LW, Ciara, Mario, B2K, and Rihanna, among others.

In the late 2000s, bands like Lillix, KSM, Everlife, and Clique Girlz became teen pop idols and have a teenage fanbase.

Discovered on YouTube by media entrepreneur Scooter Braun at the age of 13, Justin Bieber was ushered into fame with his 2009 album My World.

2010s 

In Japan, more and more Japanese idol groups have appeared. In Japanese culture, persons called "idols" are media personalities in their teens and early twenties who are considered particularly attractive or cute and who will, for a period ranging from several months to a few years, regularly appear in the mass media, e.g. as singers for pop groups, bit-part actors, TV personalities, models in photo spreads published in magazines, advertisements, etc. One of the most successful groups is Momoiro Clover Z. Their performances incorporate elements of ballet, gymnastics, and action movies. During 2014, about 486,000 people attended their live concerts, which was the highest record of all female musicians in Japan. Momoiro Clover Z has been ranked as one of the most popular female idol groups from 2013 to 2017.

In the late 2010s, many young actors developed large followings amongst teenagers and millennials after portraying famous contemporary literary characters. The most notable among these were Timothée Chalamet (Elio Perlman) and Nick Robinson (Simon Spier). These actors were referred to by the media and general public as "White Boys of the Month", with the term becoming a popular meme since. Noah Centineo became popular among teenagers and young adults following the release of To All the Boys I've Loved Before, having amassed over 15 million Instagram followers within eight weeks of the film's release; he was dubbed an "internet boyfriend" by the media.

Although the future members of the boy band One Direction did not do well on the third season of X Factor U.K., guest judge Nicole Scherzinger suggested that they form a group together. The result was much fame and fortune for the band, which bursted onto the scene in 2012. The group went on indefinite hiatus in 2016, and since 2017 its members have been pursuing solo projects.

Similarly, in 2016 the Cuban-born American singer Camila Cabello left the girl group Fifth Harmony, which went on indefinite hiatus in 2018, in order to pursue a solo career. She makes use of her Latin American heritage in her rhythms. At age 18, American musician Billie Eilish won four Grammy Awards in 2020, and was commissioned to perform the theme song for the James Bond movie No Time to Die (2021). The song topped the charts in February 2020. She wrote it with her brother, Finneas, becoming the youngest artist to do so. She has tens of millions of followers on social media, especially among Generation Z, and is well known for her lyrics concerning depression and anxiety.

2020s 

American artist Olivia Rodrigo had previously worked as a child actress on the Disney comedy series Bizaardvark (2016–19) and starred in the first three seasons of High School Musical: The Musical: The Series (2019–present). In January 2021, she released her debut single, "Drivers License", which went on to become one of the most streamed songs on Spotify at the time and spent eight weeks on top of the Billboard Hot 100 chart. She sings with profanities in an emotionally charged manner of the struggles of an adolescent and commands a large following on social media networks, including TikTok, where she has many teen-aged supporters. She claims to have been influenced by Taylor Swift and Lorde. Some sources consider Rodrigo to be a representative of Generation Z.

Italian rock band Måneskin was ushered into worldwide attention after winning the Eurovision Song Contest 2021, with their winning track "Zitti e buoni" as well as "I Wanna Be Your Slave" and their cover of The Four Seasons' "Beggin'" reaching the top 10 on the Billboard Global Excl. U.S. chart, supported by a growing following on TikTok and other social media platforms. Prior to their Eurovision win, the band finished as runner-up in the eleventh season of the Italian X Factor in 2017. Måneskin are credited as one of the first rock bands to heavily appeal to Generation Z.

Impact and influence 

In the West, the Beatles, Bob Dylan, and the Rolling Stones were extremely popular among the Baby Boomers. Parents, by contrast, saw their influence greatly diminished. In the United Kingdom, for instance, a combination of the Lady Chatterley trial (1959) and the first long-play of the Beatles, Please Please Me (1963) triggered a change public perception of human mating, a cause subsequently taken up by young people seeking sexual liberation.

During the 1960s and 1970s, the music industry made a fortune selling rock records to people between the ages of fourteen and twenty-five. This era was home to many youthful stars—people like Brian Jones of the Rolling Stones or Jimi Hendrix—who had lifestyles that all but guaranteed early deaths. The death of a (former) teen idol can have a serious impact on fans, leading to outbursts of emotions. This was certainly the case when people like Davy Jones or Michael Jackson died. Moreover, even as their fans age, the audience of idols does not necessarily shrink, as the fans who became parents can introduce their children to their music. People tend to be nostalgic about music from their youth. In the twenty-first century, (former) teen idols can continue to be highly successful years after they made their debut as can be seen from the number of streams, digital downloads, CDs, cassettes, and vinyl records shipped.

The charm and charisma manifested by American actor James Dean onscreen proved strongly appealing to the audience, and his persona of youthful rebellion provided a template for succeeding generations of youth to model themselves on. Various artists, including Leonardo DiCaprio, Buddy Holly, and David Bowie, cited Dean as an influence. American singer-songwriter Taylor Swift referenced him in "Style" (2014). Meanwhile, wearing white T-shirts and jeans remains iconic among young people today.

The K-pop band Girls' Generation has generally been considered as a cultural icon of not just South Korea, but also a part of the Korean wave, the rising popularity of Korean culture on the international stage. As of 2019, another K-pop band, BTS, was reportedly worth more than US$4.65 billion, or 0.3 percent of the GDP of their home country.  They attracted one in every 13 foreign visitors to South Korea and were cited as one of the key acts in boosting global music sales to US$19 billion in 2018. Data from the International Federation of the Phonographic Industry (IFPI) shows that BTS became the best selling artists of 2020 worldwide, ahead of Taylor Swift, Drake, the Weeknd, and Billie Eilish.

See also

 Celebrity Worship Syndrome
 Junior idol
 K-Pop idol
 Matinee idol
 Pin-up
 Sex symbol
 Youth culture

Notes

References

 
Adolescence
Celebrity
Youth culture